Fieldside Covert is a woodland in Northamptonshire, England, near the village of Yelvertoft. It is owned and managed by the Woodland Trust.

References

Forests and woodlands of Northamptonshire